Iván Luis Zamorano Zamora (born 18 January 1967) is a Chilean former professional footballer who played as a striker. He is regarded as one of Chile's most recognized footballers, along with Marcelo Salas, Leonel Sánchez and Elias Figueroa.

He was a member of the Chile national team and played in the 1998 World Cup, four Copa América tournaments, and the Olympics in 2000 with the u-23 team, where he won a bronze medal and was the top scorer of the tournament. He played for several clubs, notably Spanish clubs Sevilla and Real Madrid C.F.; Italian club Inter Milan as well as Liga MX club Club America.  He won the 1994–95 La Liga title and was the season's top scorer with Real Madrid. He also won the UEFA Cup with Inter Milan in 1998 as well as the Liga MX title with Club America his first season with the club. A powerful and prolific goal-scorer, he was particularly renowned for his strength and ability in the air, with many of his goals coming from headers.

In 2004, Zamorano was selected among the FIFA 100, a list of the best living football players in the world compiled by Pelé.

Zamorano was nicknamed Bam Bam and Iván el Terrible.

Club career
Born in Santiago, Zamorano started his career in Chile with Cobresal in December 1985. He was loaned out to Chilean Primera Division B club Trasandino (called Cobreandino between 1985–1992) for the 1985–86 season. He returned to the club shortly after and won the 1987 Copa Chile with Cobresal. In 1988, he moved to Europe to Swiss team FC St. Gallen, becoming the league's top scorer in the 1989–90 season, and scoring 37 goals in 61 matches across three seasons. In 1990 Zamorano debuted in the Spanish Primera División with Sevilla, where he would play 63 matches and score 23 goals in all competitions before being sold to Real Madrid for $6 million.

With Real Madrid, between 1992 and 1996, Zamorano won one league, one Copa del Rey, and one Spanish Supercup title. In 1995, under manager Jorge Valdano, Zamorano helped Real Madrid win the Spanish League title, as he scored 28 goals – including a hat–trick against FC Barcelona – and received the Pichichi Trophy as the season's top scorer. That year, he formed a particularly effective attacking partnership with playmaker Michael Laudrup. In the 1992–93 and 1994–95 seasons, he won the EFE Trophy, which is awarded to the best Ibero-American player in La Liga every year by Spanish news agency EFE. In total, Zamorano appeared 173 times for Real Madrid, scoring 101 goals.

After six seasons in the Spanish league, Zamorano played four seasons in Serie A with Inter Milan, from 1996 to 2000, where he was teammates with Youri Djorkaeff, Diego Simeone, Javier Zanetti, and Ronaldo, among others. He was initially the club's premier striker, holding the coveted number nine shirt. However, upon Baggio's arrival at the club, Ronaldo was forced to give up number ten, and wear number nine, therefore Zamorano had to give up his number but refused to wear another and started wearing a shirt bearing the number '1+8', therefore making him mathematically still a number 9 striker. In May 1998, Inter won the UEFA Cup after beating Lazio in the final 3–0, with Zamorano scoring the opening goal. He had also scored in the second leg of the previous year's final, with the game going to penalties. However, Zamorano missed his penalty as Inter lost the shootout to Schalke 04 4–1.

Zamorano would move to Mexico in 2001 to play for América for two seasons, winning the Torneo de Verano in the first season. He concluded his career playing for Colo-Colo in 2003, making a childhood dream come true. He announced his retirement in July of that year after a professional career spanning more than 16 years.

International career
Zamorano made his debut at the age of 20 on 19 June 1987, scoring a goal in a 3–1 friendly win against Peru. He scored five goals on 29 April 1997 in a 1998 World Cup qualifier against Venezuela, which ended in a 6–0 victory. He played all four of Chile's matches at the 1998 World Cup; he was an instrumental part of the Chilean team despite failing to score, setting up Marcelo Salas' goal in a 1–1 draw against Austria. In the 2000 Olympic Games, he won the bronze medal, scoring a brace in a 2–0 victory against United States, and was the top scorer with six goals. His last international match, at age 34, was a farewell friendly between Chile and France on 1 September 2001, which Chile won 2–1. Zamorano was capped 69 times, scoring 34 goals.

Personal life
Zamorano has a long-term close friendship with his former fellow footballer Fabián Estay, which was interrupted from 2001 to 2007 due to the fact that Estay stated that Zamorano didn't support him when he was isolated from the América first team by the club leaders. In addition, Zamorano is the godfather of the Estay's daughter, Renata Ivana.

In 2005, he married María Alberó, an Argentine model. 

Since 2016, he has made his home in Miami, United States, and has worked as a football commentator for media such as Univision and TUDN.

Outside football
Zamorano was the promotional face of the new Santiago transport system, Transantiago, which has brought him criticism because of the system's starting failures; some even say his credibility may have been damaged.

Career statistics

Club

International

Scores and results list Chile's goal tally first, score column indicates score after each Zamorano goal.

Honours
Cobreandino
 Segunda División de Chile: 1985

Cobresal
 Copa Chile: 1987

Real Madrid
 La Liga: 1994–95
 Copa del Rey: 1992–93
 Supercopa de España: 1993

Inter Milan
 UEFA Cup: 1997–98; runner-up 1996–97

Club América
 Mexican Primera División: Verano 2002

Chile
 Olympic Bronze Medal: 2000

Individual
 Swiss Super League Best Foreign Player: 1989–90
 EFE Trophy: 1992–93, 1994–95
 Pichichi Trophy: 1994–95
 La Liga Best Foreign Player: 1994–95
 European Sports Media Team of the Year: 1994–95
 Olympic Games top scorer: 2000
 FIFA 100

References

External links

 Inter profile 
 Iván Luis Zamorano - Detail of international matches and goals - rsssf.com (RSSSF).
 
 

1967 births
Living people
Footballers from Santiago
1987 Copa América players
1991 Copa América players
1993 Copa América players
1998 FIFA World Cup players
1999 Copa América players
Association football forwards
Chile international footballers
Chilean expatriate footballers
Chilean expatriate sportspeople in Mexico
Chilean expatriate sportspeople in Italy
Chilean expatriate sportspeople in Spain
Chilean expatriate sportspeople in Switzerland
Chilean footballers
Chilean Primera División players
Club América footballers
Cobresal footballers
Colo-Colo footballers
Expatriate footballers in Italy
Expatriate footballers in Mexico
Expatriate footballers in Spain
Expatriate footballers in Switzerland
FC St. Gallen players
FIFA 100
Footballers at the 2000 Summer Olympics
Inter Milan players
La Liga players
Liga MX players
Medalists at the 2000 Summer Olympics
Olympic bronze medalists for Chile
Olympic footballers of Chile
Olympic medalists in football
Pichichi Trophy winners
Real Madrid CF players
Serie A players
Sevilla FC players
Swiss Super League players
Trasandino footballers
People named in the Panama Papers
UEFA Cup winning players
Pan American Games medalists in football
Pan American Games silver medalists for Chile
Footballers at the 1987 Pan American Games
Medalists at the 1987 Pan American Games
Chilean association football commentators